USS Verdi (SP-979) was a United States Navy patrol vessel in commission from 1917 to 1918.

Verdi was built as a private motorboat of the same name in 1909 by the Charles L. Seabury Company and the Gas Engine and Power Company at Morris Heights in the Bronx, New York. She was the property of Walter J. Green of Utica, New York, and home-ported at Clayton, New York, on the St. Lawrence River when the U.S. Navy acquired her from Green on 30 June 1917 for use as a section patrol boat during World War I. She was commissioned as USS Verdi (SP-979) on 10 August 1917.

Assigned to the 9th Naval District, Verdi patrolled on the Great Lakes for the rest of World War I.

Verdi was returned to Green on 4 December 1918.

References

Department of the Navy Naval History and Heritage Command Online Library of Selected Images: U.S. Navy Ships: USS Verdi (SP-979), 1917-1918. Previously the civilian motor boat Verdi (1909)
NavSource Online: Section Patrol Craft Photo Archive Verdi (SP 979)

Patrol vessels of the United States Navy
World War I patrol vessels of the United States
Ships built in Morris Heights, Bronx
1909 ships
Great Lakes ships
Maritime incidents in 1935
Shipwrecks of the New York (state) coast